Indothais lacera is a species of sea snail, a marine gastropod mollusk in the family Muricidae, the murex snails or rock snails.

Description 
The size of an adult shell varies between 30 mm and 57 mm.

Distribution
This species occurs in the Indian Ocean off South Africa, in the Red Sea, in the Mediterranean Sea and in the Pacific Ocean off Southeast Asia.

References

 Vine, P. (1986). Red Sea Invertebrates. Immel Publishing, London. 224 pp
 Gofas, S.; Le Renard, J.; Bouchet, P. (2001). Mollusca, in: Costello, M.J. et al. (Ed.) (2001). European register of marine species: a check-list of the marine species in Europe and a bibliography of guides to their identification. Collection Patrimoines Naturels, 50: pp. 180–213
 Streftaris, N.; Zenetos, A.; Papathanassiou, E. (2005). Globalisation in marine ecosystems: the story of non-indigenous marine species across European seas. Oceanogr. Mar. Biol. Annu. Rev. 43: 419–453
 Leung KF. & Morton B. (2003). Effects of long-term anthropogenic perturbations on three subtidal epibenthic molluscan communities in Hong Kong. In: Morton B, editor. Proceedings of an International Workshop Reunion Conference, Hong Kong: Perspectives on Marine Environment Change in Hong Kong and Southern China, 1977-2001. Hong Kong University Press, Hong Kong. pp 655-717
 Claremont, M., Vermeij, G. J., Williams, S. T. & Reid, D. G. (2013). Global phylogeny and new classification of the Rapaninae (Gastropoda: Muricidae), dominant molluscan predators on tropical rocky seashores. Molecular Phylogenetics and Evolution. 66: 91–102.

External links

 
 Born, I. Von. (1778). Index rerum naturalium Musei Cæsarei Vindobonensis. Pars I.ma. Testacea. Verzeichniß der natürlichen Seltenheiten des k. k. Naturalien Cabinets zu Wien. Erster Theil. Schalthiere
 Lamarck, (J.-B. M.) de. (1822). Histoire naturelle des animaux sans vertèbres. Tome septième. Paris: published by the Author, 711 pp
 Jenkins, H. M. (1864). On some Tertiary Mollusca from Mount Séla, in the island of Java. Quarterly Journal of the Geological Society of London. Volume 20, pp. 45-65, pls. 6, 7
 Link, D.H.F. (1807-1808). Beschreibung der Naturalien-Sammlung der Universität zu Rostock. Adlers Erben. 1 Abt
 Katsanevakis, S.; Bogucarskis, K.; Gatto, F.; Vandekerkhove, J.; Deriu, I.; Cardoso A.S. (2012). Building the European Alien Species Information Network (EASIN): a novel approach for the exploration of distributed alien species data. BioInvasions Records. 1: 235-245

lacera
Gastropods described in 1778
Taxa named by Ignaz von Born